Sunland Heat is a 2004 American martial arts film directed by Halder Gomes and starring J. J. Perry.

Cast
Alex Van Hagen as Jennifer
J. J. Perry as Matthews
Jay Richardson as Daniel
André Lima as John Paul
Laura Putney as Jackie
Halder Gomes as Carlos
Odilon Camargo	as Roy
Alexandre Picarelli as Mark

Production
Working as stunt in American martial arts films, Gomes came with the idea of producing a martial art film shot in his birth city, Fortaleza, Ceará. However, Gomes prepared no script, then he went to a local film school and announced he was looking for a script writer for a martial arts film. The next step was to raise funds, which was done through gubernamental tax incentives. For the casting Gomes put an ad in the Back Stage West, and received about 3,000 subsmissions. He was worried to cast people who had already travelled to another country because he thought the recentness of September 11 attacks could affect actor's performance. The film was shot both in Ceará and Los Angeles during a period of four weeks.

References

External links

2004 martial arts films
2004 films
American martial arts films
Films directed by Halder Gomes
Films shot in Fortaleza
Films shot in Los Angeles
2000s English-language films
2000s American films